Xylopoli , is a village and a community of the Lagkadas municipality. Before the 2011 local government reform it was part of the municipality of Lachanas, of which it was a municipal district and the seat. The 2011 census recorded 855 inhabitants in the village. The community of Xylopoli covers an area of 34.422 km2.

See also
 List of settlements in the Thessaloniki regional unit

References

Populated places in Thessaloniki (regional unit)